Bogdana Sadovaia Vasilievna (born 9 December 1989) is a Ukrainian born field hockey player who represents Russia.

Career

Club level
At club level, Bogdana Sadovaia represents Moscomsport in the Russian national league.

National teams

Ukraine
From 2007 until 2012, Sadovaia represented her home country Ukraine in international tournaments. This included a bronze medal at the 2011 Indoor World Cup in Poznań.

Russia
Bogdana Sadovaia made her first appearance for Russia in 2017, following a four-year hiatus from international competition. The same year, she won her first medal with the national team, silver at the 2017 EuroHockey Championship II in Cardiff.

Sadovaia is a striker for the Russian team, with an average scoring rate of 1.46 goals per game.

References

External links
 
 

1989 births
Living people
Russian female field hockey players
Female field hockey forwards
2018 FIH Indoor Hockey World Cup players